Robert Wilburn Calvert (February 22, 1905 – October 6, 1994) was a justice of the Supreme Court of Texas from September 18, 1950 to October 4, 1972, serving as chief justice from January 3, 1961 to October 4, 1972.

His father died when he was seven, and his destitute mother placed him in an orphanage, where he endured harsh conditions for ten years, including the death of his sister from the Spanish flu in 1918. He graduated as salutatorian of the State Orphans' Home high school 1923, and then studied law at the University of Texas at Austin. He was elected to the Texas House of Representatives in 1933, and was Speaker of the Texas House of Representatives from 1937 to 1939.

References

Justices of the Texas Supreme Court
1905 births
1994 deaths
Speakers of the Texas House of Representatives
20th-century American politicians
20th-century American judges